Mindless Mass is the third album of the Polish brutal death metal act Sphere. The LP was recorded in Sound Division studio, mixed, mastered and produced in Heinrich House, all supervised by Filip 'Heinricha' Hałucha, and released on CD by Deformeathing Production  on 19 June 2015. Cover art is by Perversor.

The album consists of 12 brutal death tracks with a strong touch of melodies and old school death metal, plus intro and outro. Jacek Hiro, known from his contribution in bands such as Sceptic, Decapitated, Voodoo Gods, Vader, Dies Irae has a guitar solo on the Leash track.

Mindless Mass was promoted by a videoclip for the "Society Foetus" track.

Track listing
"Come to Us!" (intro, music: Michał Staczkun) – 1:02
"Baptism" (lyrics: Olga Górczyńska, Dawidek, music: Iron) – 2:57
"Society Foetus" (lyrics: Olga Górczyńska, Dawidek, music: Diego) – 2:58
"Spider's Web" (lyrics: Olga Górczyńska, Dawidek, music: Diego) – 3:34
"Retaliation" (lyrics: Laska, music: Diego) – 2:55
"Let to Live" (lyrics: Diego, music: Diego) – 3:05
"Cage of Conformity" (lyrics: Diego, music: Iron) – 2:29
"Leash" (lyrics: Olga Górczyńska, Dawidek, music: Iron) – 3:48
"Mindless Mass" (lyrics: Dawidek, music: Iron) – 3:58
"Golden Calf Sculpture" (lyrics: Diego, music: Iron) – 2:04
"Red Hood" (lyrics: Olga Górczyńska, Dawidek, music: Diego) – 3:49
"Manifesto" (lyrics: Diego, Dawidek, music: Diego) – 5:49
"Spring Lullaby" (lyrics: Olga Górczyńska, music: Iron) – 3:24
"I Am the Cross" (outro, music: Diego) – 7:35

Personnel
Th0rn - drums
Diego - guitars
Beton - bass, backing vocals
Iron - guitars
Dawidek - vocals

References

2015 albums
Sphere (Polish band) albums